David A. McAllester (born May 30, 1956) is an American computer scientist who is Professor and former chief academic officer at the Toyota Technological Institute at Chicago. He received his B.S., M.S. and Ph.D. degrees from the Massachusetts Institute of Technology in 1978, 1979 and 1987 respectively. His PhD was supervised by Gerald Sussman. He was on the faculty of Cornell University for the academic year 1987-1988 and on the faculty of MIT from 1988 to 1995. He was a member of technical staff at AT&T Labs-Research from 1995 to 2002. He has been a fellow of the American Association of Artificial Intelligence since 1997. He has written over 100 refereed publications.

McAllester's research areas include machine learning theory, the theory of programming languages, automated reasoning, AI planning, computer game playing (computer chess) and computational linguistics. A 1991 paper on AI planning proved to be one of the most influential papers of the decade in that area. A 1993 paper on computer game algorithms influenced the design of the algorithms used in the Deep Blue chess system that defeated Garry Kasparov. A 1998 paper on machine learning theory introduced PAC-Bayesian theorems which combine Bayesian and non-Bayesian methods.

Opinions on artificial intelligence
McAllester has voiced concerns about the potential dangers of artificial intelligence, writing in an article to the Pittsburgh Tribune-Review that it is inevitable that fully automated intelligent machines will be able to design and build smarter, better versions of themselves, an event known as the singularity. The singularity would enable machines to become infinitely intelligent, and would pose an "incredibly dangerous scenario". McAllester estimates a 10 percent probability of the Singularity occurring within 25 years, and a 90 percent probability of it occurring within 75 years. He appeared on the AAAI Presidential Panel on Long-Term AI Futures in 2009:, and considers the dangers of superintelligent AI worth taking seriously:  He was later described as discussing the singularity at the panel in terms of two major milestones in artificial intelligence: 

McAllester has also written on friendly artificial intelligence on his blog. He says that before machines become capable of programming themselves (potentially leading to the singularity), there should be a period where they are moderately intelligent in which it should be possible to test out giving them a purpose or mission that should render them safe to humans:

References

External links
David McAllester's academic page at TTIC.
Machine Thoughts, David McAllester's personal blog.
David Allen McAllester at the Mathematics Genealogy Project.

Artificial intelligence researchers
Massachusetts Institute of Technology alumni
Toyota Technological Institute at Chicago faculty
Living people
1956 births
Fellows of the Association for the Advancement of Artificial Intelligence
American computer scientists